Teeny-Tiny and the Witch-Woman is a story written by Barbara K. Walker and illustrated by Michael Foreman based on an old Turkish folk tale. The story
was first published in 1975 by Pantheon Books and an animated short based on the story was produced by Weston Woods on May 31, 1980, directed by Gene Deitch.

The Tale
The story is about three brothers who live in a Turkish village with their mother and grandmother. Their names are Big-One (The eldest brother), In-The-Middle (The middle brother), and Teeny-Tiny (The youngest brother). The two older brothers often mock Teeny-Tiny because of his size and that he is the youngest. The brothers play in and around the village every day. Their mother warns them to never go into the forest, where, according to their grandmother, lives a "Witch-Woman" who eats little children and uses their bones to build a fence around her house.

One day, Big-One decides that it might be fun to go play in the woods. In-The-Middle agrees with Big-One, and they ask Teeny-Tiny if he'd like to join them. Teeny-Tiny declines his brothers' offer and reminds them of their grandmother's story. Big-One and In-The-Middle both ignore Teeny-Tiny's warnings and decide to go anyway. Reluctant, Teeny-Tiny follows his brothers, but keeps "His eyes open and his legs ready to run."

The boys spend all afternoon playing in the forest and soon it starts to get fairly dark, and the three become lost, hungry and tired. Searching for a way out of the woods, Teeny-Tiny climbs a tree and spots a light in the distance. He and his brothers make their way towards the source - a cottage owned by a grotesque old woman. She offers them food and shelter for the night and promises to lead them out of the woods the next morning. Big-One and In-The-Middle heartily accept the woman's hospitality. Teeny-Tiny is less enthusiastic but relents.

After the boys finish their supper, the old woman shows them upstairs to her spare bedroom. Big-One and In-The-Middle both fall asleep right away, but Teeny-Tiny, uneasy, stays awake. Looking out of the bedroom window, he notices a knobby white fence surrounding the house and realizes it is made of human bones. Suddenly, Teeny-Tiny hears what sounds like somebody sharpening a knife. The Witch-Woman comes up the stairs and calls out to the boys, "Who is awake, and who is asleep?"

To the Witch-Woman's query, Teeny-Tiny replies "The littlest one is awake." Aware of the old woman's motives, Teeny-Tiny makes up a series of bedtime rituals, such as cooking an egg, popcorn and raisins, and water in a sieve, to stall for time. While the Witch-Woman prepares to fetch some water in a sieve for Teeny-Tiny, she places her three magic items, a bar of soap, a sewing needle, and a knife on a high shelf. Teeny-Tiny takes this opportunity to wake up his brothers and inform them of the old woman's true identity. The three brothers sneak into the kitchen and climb up on each other's shoulders to steal the objects from the high shelf before fleeing from the cottage. Still engrossed in her futile chore, the Witch-Woman looks up, sees the boys running away, and makes chase.

Pursued, Teeny-Tiny uses the magical items they had pilfered earlier. The first item he uses is the soap, creating a mountain of foam, forcing the Witch-Woman to run around. Then Teeny-Tiny throws the sewing needle, creating a mountain of needles, which the Witch-Woman runs into. Undaunted for the second time, the Witch-Woman continues pursuing the brothers and begins catching up. Desperate, Teeny-Tiny throws the knife over his shoulder. The knife cuts a crack in the earth, creating a ravine and abyss so long and wide, the Witch-Woman can neither run around it nor jump over it. Defeated, she angrily proclaims that she will get them next time as she begins her long walk back to her cottage. Teeny-Tiny and his brothers continue running until they safely make it back to their village. Then they are greeted by their mother, who is happy to see them safe and sound. As for the Witch-Woman, she waits inside her cottage for a long, long time, before she hears a knock on her door again.

Animated Short
An animated short based on Barbara K. Walker's book was created by Weston Woods Studios in 1980. The short is a retelling of the thrilling story featuring frightening and sometimes amusing imagery. The short was first released on 16mm film for use in schools and libraries. This short has also been featured on a number of collections of other scary stories such as the Children's Circle video series and some holiday collections by Scholastic Books. The short was directed by veteran Weston Woods Studios director, Gene Deitch.

See also
 Baba Yaga
Halloween
A Very Brave Witch, a similar book about a witch

External links
 
 Teeny-Tiny and the Witch-Woman on IMDb
Turkish folklore
1975 children's books
1980 films
Pantheon Books books
American picture books
Children's books adapted into films